The 1976 Miami Dolphins season was the team's 11th, and seventh as a member of the National Football League (NFL). The Dolphins failed to improve on their previous season's output of 10–4, winning only six games. One of these wins came over their new in-state rivals, the Tampa Bay Buccaneers — who proceeded to lose all 14 games that year. The 6–8 finish marked the first losing record of head coach Don Shula's career.

The Dolphins would not have another losing season until the  1988 Season.

Offseason

NFL Draft

Personnel

Staff

Roster

Regular season

Schedule 

Note: Intra-division opponents are in bold text.

Standings

References

External links 
 1976 Miami Dolphins at Pro-Football-Reference.com

Miami Dolphins seasons
Miami Dolphins
Miami Dolphins